Survey Review is an academic journal published by Taylor & Francis about surveying.
It started in 1931 as Empire Survey Review and acquired the current name in 1963.
Its editor-in-chief is Peter Collier;
its 2018 impact factor is 1.442.

References

Taylor & Francis academic journals
Earth and atmospheric sciences journals
Engineering journals
Surveying